Edison's Lights is an album by trumpeter Harry Edison recorded in 1976 and released by the Pablo label.

Reception

AllMusic reviewer Scott Yanow stated "All of the musicians sound quite inspired and are heard throughout playing at their best and most colorful".

Track listing
All compositions by Harry Edison except where noted
 "Edison's Lights" – 6:36
 "Ain't Misbehavin'" (Fats Waller, Harry Brooks, Andy Razaf) – 6:00
 "Avalon" (Buddy DeSylva, Vincent Rose, Al Jolson) – 5:40
 ""E"" – 8:49
 "Helena's Theme" – 3:22
 "Home Grown" – 6:48
 "Spring Is Here" (Richard Rodgers, Lorenz Hart) – 6:27
 "On the Trail" (Ferde Grofé) – 7:10

Personnel 
Harry Edison – trumpet
Eddie "Lockjaw" Davis – tenor saxophone
William Basie (tracks 1-4), Dolo Coker (tracks 5-8) – piano
John Heard – bass
Jimmy Smith – drums

References 

1976 albums
Harry Edison albums
Pablo Records albums
Albums produced by Norman Granz